Jacques G. Losman is a Belgian transplant surgeon who helped to develop the heterotopic heart transplant model. In 1997, he received the lifetime service award of the International Society for Heart and Lung Transplantation.

References 

Living people
Year of birth missing (living people)
French transplant surgeons